The Minister of Education, formerly the Minister of Human Resources Development (1985-2020), is the head of the Ministry of Education and one of the cabinet ministers of the Government of India.

List of Ministers

Notes

Latest News : Mr Dharmendra Pradhan, Honorable Minister of Education of India will receive th 14th February 2022 Mr Schönenberger Claudius, Professor in France who revolutionize the learning process of Indian History by the launching of Evnseries.com on last Diwali.

References

External links
 List of HRD Ministers

Union ministers of India
Lists of government ministers of India